David Kajganich (born November 15, 1969) is an American screenwriter and producer. He has written several works in the horror genre, including the film Blood Creek (2009), and the network series The Terror (2018). He has also collaborated on three films with the Italian director Luca Guadagnino, A Bigger Splash (2015) and the horror films Suspiria (2018) and Bones and All (2022).

Early life
A native of Ohio, Kajganich graduated from a writer's workshop at the University of Iowa, and began teaching English at the university.

Career
While still living in Ohio, Kajganich was hired to adapt Heinrich Boll's The Lost Honour of Katharina Blum for the screen, but the project fell through. He was subsequently hired to write the screenplay for The Invasion (2007), a reimagining of Invasion of the Body Snatchers. His following screenplay, initially titled Town Creek, was filmed in 2009 and released under the title Blood Creek, directed by Joel Schumacher. He subsequently wrote the screenplay for True Story (2015), a crime-drama starring Jonah Hill and James Franco, based on the Michael Finkel book of the same name.

Kajganich wrote the screenplay for Luca Guadagnino's 2015 remake, A Bigger Splash, a loose remake of the 1969 film La Piscine. He subsequently composed the screenplay for Guadagnino's remake of the horror film Suspiria.

Kajganich developed The Terror (2018), a television series based on the Dan Simmons novel of the same name. He served as co-showrunner alongside Soo Hugh for the show's first season. In 2016, Kajganich began co-writing a new adaptation of Stephen King's Pet Sematary, which was released in 2019. He was ultimately not credited on the film.

On April 8, 2019, it was announced that Kajganich would adapt Camille DeAngelis's novel Bones & All for the screen. The film, Bones and All, directed by Luca Guadagnino, premiered at the Venice International Film Festival in 2022.

Filmography

References

External links

1969 births
American male screenwriters
American television writers
American male television writers
Screenwriters from Ohio
Showrunners
University of Iowa alumni
Living people
American people of Serbian descent
American gay writers
American LGBT screenwriters
LGBT people from Ohio